Squalidus is a genus of cyprinid fish that occurs in eastern Asia.  There are currently 14 described species in this genus.

Species
 Squalidus argentatus (Sauvage & Dabry de Thiersant, 1874)
 Squalidus atromaculatus (Nichols & C. H. Pope, 1927)
 Squalidus banarescui I. S. Chen & Y. C. Chang, 2007
 Squalidus chankaensis Dybowski, 1872 (Khanka gudgeon)
 Squalidus chankaensis biwae (D. S. Jordan & Snyder, 1900)
 Squalidus chankaensis chankaensis Dybowski, 1872 
 Squalidus gracilis (Temminck & Schlegel, 1846)
 Squalidus gracilis gracilis (Temminck & Schlegel, 1846)
 Squalidus gracilis majimae (D. S. Jordan & C. L. Hubbs, 1925)
 Squalidus homozonus (Günther, 1868)
 Squalidus iijimae (Ōshima, 1919)
 Squalidus intermedius (Nichols, 1929)
 Squalidus japonicus (Sauvage, 1883)
 Squalidus japonicus coreanus (L. S. Berg, 1906)
 Squalidus japonicus japonicus (Sauvage, 1883)
 Squalidus mantschuricus (T. Mori, 1927)
 Squalidus minor (Harada, 1943)
 Squalidus multimaculatus K. Hosoya & S. R. Jeon, 1984
 Squalidus nitens (Günther, 1873)
 Squalidus wolterstorffi (Regan, 1908)

References
 

 
Fish of Asia
Freshwater fish genera
Ray-finned fish genera
Taxa named by Benedykt Dybowski